The 1916–17 NCAA men's basketball season began in December 1916, progressed through the regular season, and concluded in March 1917.

Season headlines 

 In February 1943, the Helms Athletic Foundation retroactively selected Washington State as its national champion for the 1916–17 season.
 In 1995, the Premo-Porretta Power Poll retroactively selected Washington State as its national champion for the 1916–17 season.

Conference membership changes

NOTE: Although Oregon joined the Pacific Coast Conference in 1915, it did not field a basketball team during the 1915–16 season, and its first season of Pacific Coast Conference play was 1916–17.

Regular season

Conference winners

Statistical leaders

Awards

Helms College Basketball All-Americans 

The practice of selecting a Consensus All-American Team did not begin until the 1928–29 season. The Helms Athletic Foundation later retroactively selected a list of All-Americans for the 1916–17 season.

Major player of the year awards 

 Helms Player of the Year: Ray Woods, Illinois (retroactive selection in 1944)

References